Charlie Lake may refer to:
 Charlie Lake, British Columbia, a settlement in British Columbia, Canada
 Charlie Lake (British Columbia), a lake in north-eastern British Columbia, Canada
 The Charlie Lake Formation, a Geological formation